Tang Wing-Cheung  (20 June 1916 – 20 April 1997), better known by his stage name Sun Ma Sze Tsang, was a Cantonese opera singer and actor in Hong Kong.

Career
Born in Shunde, Guangdong, China, his parents divorced when he was eight. His father, Tang Kei, was a gambling and Cantonese opera addict. He moved to Hong Kong with his mother, Lo Lin, after she had divorced his father. His mother worked as a maid and was often bullied. Tang later left home to learn Cantonese opera.

Tang impressed the Cantonese opera industry by his stunning performance that resembled Ma Sze-Tsang, a famous Cantonese opera singer. His teacher gave him the stagename Sun Ma Sze Tsang, meaning 'New Ma Sze-Tsang'. Sun Ma Sze Tsang became very famous for his singing technique. He later became pupils of Sit Kok-Sin, Kai Chiao-tien and other famous Chinese opera singers in Shanghai. From then on his career flourished and he went on to become a film star, while continuing to perform in Cantonese operas. His film debut was in 1936.

Scientists wanted to study his skeleton to understand how people with a small frame like him could hit ultra-high notes. Sun Ma Sze Tsang refused when he was alive, and his family never approved of it.

Charity
Sun was a charitable man who had attended the Tung Wah Charity Show for many years, performing his hits like Man Ok Yan Wai Shou, Emperor Kuang-hsu Mourns Consort Zhen. His performances garnered huge amount of donations and were seen by TVB, the largest Hong Kong TV station, as the most important performance in the Tung Wah Charity Show. He, therefore, gained the nickname of 'King of Charitable Opera' in Hong Kong.

Honorary professorship and honour
Sun Ma Sze Tsang was appointed, in 1977, an honorary professor of the University of Cambridge. In 1978, he was made a Member of the Most Excellent Order of the British Empire (MBE).

Death
Sun Ma Sze Tsang suffered from bronchitis and heart diseases. There is an rumour that he was the only man in Hong Kong who had a special license to smoke opium since the 20th century. Sun Ma Sze Tsang died in hospital on 20 April 1997 at 8:30 pm after staying in hospital for 109 days. After his death, his sons, including TVB artiste Johnny Tang, fought a court battle with their birth mother, Hong Kam-Mui, over their father's assets.

External links
 HK cinemagic entry
 
 

Hong Kong male Cantonese opera actors
Hong Kong male film actors
1916 births
1997 deaths
People from Foshan
Male actors from Guangdong
Members of the Kuomintang
20th-century Hong Kong male actors
20th-century Chinese male  singers
Chinese male film actors
20th-century Hong Kong male singers
20th-century Chinese male actors
Chinese emigrants to British Hong Kong